The 1950–51 UCLA Bruins men's basketball team represented the University of California, Los Angeles during the 1950–51 NCAA men's basketball season and were members of the Pacific Coast Conference. The Bruins were led by third year head coach John Wooden. They finished the regular season with a record of 19–10 and tied for the southern division championship with a record of 9–4. The Bruins lost to the Washington Huskies in the conference play-offs.

Previous season

The Bruins finished the regular season with a record of 24–7 and were southern division champions with a record of 10–2.

Roster

Schedule

|-
!colspan=9 style=|Regular Season

|-
!colspan=9 style=|Conference Championship

Source

References

UCLA Bruins men's basketball seasons
Ucla
UCLA Bruins Basketball
UCLA Bruins Basketball